Moon Chae-won (born November 13, 1986) is a South Korean actress. Moon first attracted attention in 2008 in her supporting role as a gisaeng in Painter of the Wind. She was next cast in Brilliant Legacy, one of the top-rated Korean dramas of 2009. The year of 2011 marked Moon's career breakthrough, with leading roles in the television period drama The Princess' Man and the action blockbuster War of the Arrows; both were critical and commercial hits. For her performance in the latter, Moon won Best New Actress at the Grand Bell Awards and the Blue Dragon Film Awards. Moon's other notable television series include the revenge melodrama The Innocent Man (2012), the medical drama Good Doctor (2013), and the thriller melodrama  Flower of Evil (2020).

Early life
Moon Chae-won was born in Daegu, South Korea. When she was in sixth grade, her family moved to Seoul. She studied Western Painting at the Chugye University for the Arts but dropped out in 2006 to pursue acting.

Career

2007–2010: Beginnings
Moon made her acting debut in 2007 in Mackerel Run, alongside fellow newcomer Lee Min-ho; they were among 60 actors who auditioned for the teen sitcom. Moon and Lee also appeared in the 2008 comedy film Our School's E.T..

Her breakthrough came in 2008 period drama Painter of the Wind. In the adaptation of Lee Jung-myung's historical fiction novel, she played a beautiful gisaeng who falls for Shin Yun-bok (played by Moon Geun-young), a female painter passing herself off as a man. Their onscreen chemistry and the homoerotic subtext of their characters' relationship was received positively, and the couple subsequently received the most votes in the Best Couple poll at the 2008 SBS Drama Awards. It was the first time in Korean drama history that two actresses won the Best Couple Award, despite the sexual conservatism of Korean network television.

Moon's further raised her profile with Brilliant Legacy, in which she played a privileged girl who alternately antagonizes and pities her stepsister. Brilliant Legacy became one of the top-rated Korean dramas of 2009, with a peak viewership rating of 47.1%. The success of the drama boosted Moon's popularity as an actress. Another supporting role followed in My Fair Lady, where she played an upbeat shoe designer who lives next door to her crush, a butler.

In October 2010, she signed with talent agency Barunson Entertainment (later renamed MSTeam). Afterwards, Moon landed her first leading role in It's Okay, Daddy's Girl, playing an immature daughter who transforms into a mature professional woman after a family tragedy.

2011: Breakthrough

In 2011, Moon was offered the sole female role in War of the Arrows, an action blockbuster set during the Second Manchu invasion of Korea. Along with her costars Park Hae-il and Ryu Seung-ryong, Moon underwent serious archery and horse-riding lessons. War of the Arrows eventually went on to become the highest grossing Korean film of 2011, with 7.48 million admissions. Moon was praised for her portrayal of a feminine yet feisty woman abducted by a foreign army on her wedding day, yet who isn't a typical damsel in distress and instead survives by her wits and sheer will. She later received Best New Actress recognition at the Grand Bell Awards and the Blue Dragon Film Awards for her performance.

Moon returned to the small screen in the Joseon-era drama The Princess' Man, about a fictional forbidden romance between the daughter of Grand Prince Suyang and the son of Kim Jongseo (played by Park Si-hoo), whose fathers were real-life political enemies. The Princess' Man was well-received critically and commercially, and though initially criticized for her acting, Moon won viewers over as the series went on, eventually winning a Top Excellence Award at the year-end KBS Drama Awards. She also received a Best Dressed nod from the Korea Lifestyle Awards for giving a boost to the hanbok fashion industry via her two period projects, and was named Honorary Prosecutor by the Supreme Prosecutors' Office.

2012–present: Acclaim
In 2012, Moon starred in the Lee Kyung-hee-penned melodrama The Innocent Man opposite Song Joong-ki. She drew praise for her performance as a cold, cynical woman groomed to take over her father's conglomerate, who later reverts to helpless innocence after losing her memory. Ratings for The Innocent Man topped its timeslot during its run and led to Moon winning a Top Excellence Award at the KBS Drama Awards for the second year in a row.

This was followed by the 2013 medical drama Good Doctor revolving around an autistic savant resident (played by Joo Won). To prepare for her role as pediatric surgeon, Moon met with real-life doctors in a hospital setting, familiarizing herself with medical terms and observing surgeries first-hand.

She next starred in Awaiting, a short film directed by Kang Je-gyu. Moon played a woman separated from her husband (played by Go Soo) for sixty years by the division of North and South Korea. Awaiting was one of the four short films comprising Beautiful 2014, an omnibus project that premiered at the 38th Hong Kong International Film Festival.

Moon returned to the big screen in a 2015 romantic comedy directed by Park Jin-pyo, which reunited her with previous Brilliant Legacy costar Lee Seung-gi. In Love Forecast, she played a weather forecaster whose pretty face belies the glib-talking, hard-drinking personality underneath. The film passed the break-even point with 1.89 million viewers 3 weeks after being released and Moon won the Producer's Choice Award at Bucheon International Film Festival. She then starred opposite Yoo Yeon-seok in Mood of the Day, in which they play two strangers who meet on the KTX and spend 24 hours together in the unfamiliar city of Busan.

Moon then took on the leading female role in MBC's thriller Goodbye Mr. Black in 2016, her first television series in three years. The same year, Moon left her former agency MS Team Entertainment and signed with Namoo Actors.

In 2017, Moon was cast in the Korean adaption of the American crime drama Criminal Minds. The same year, Moon was cast in the period film Feng Shui, the third installment of the "divining art trilogy" by Han Jae-rim.

In 2018, Moon starred in the romantic fantasy drama Tale of Fairy.

In 2020, Moon was cast in the thriller melodrama Flower of Evil, reuniting with Criminal Minds co-star Lee Joon-gi.

In 2021, Moon will be joining the cast of the comedy film No Kids alongside Kwon Sang-woo. Later in November 2021, Moon signed with YNK Entertainment after the expiration of her contract with the original agency. In December 2021, Moon participated in Korea's first audio drama Floor with Lee Je-hoon and Jeong Jun-ha.

In 2023, Moon made her return to the small screen with the SBS drama Payback, her return to terrestrial television in seven years since 2016.

Filmography

Film

Television series

Web series

Music video appearances

Discography

Singles

Awards and nominations

References

External links

 
 
 

21st-century South Korean actresses
South Korean film actresses
South Korean television actresses
South Korean Roman Catholics
1986 births
People from Daegu
Living people
Chugye University for the Arts alumni